The Dipsacaceae have been recognized as a family (the teasel family) of the order Dipsacales containing 350 species of perennial or biennial herbs and shrubs in eleven genera. The species are currently placed in the family Caprifoliaceae. Native to most temperate climates, they are found in Europe, Asia, and Africa. Some species of this family have been naturalized in other places. The spikes of the common teasel (pictured) are not particularly spiny and may be quite soft. In some places, the spikes were used in carding wool.

The family has contained these genera:.
Acanthocalyx
Dipsacus (teasel)
Knautia
Scabiosa
Succisa (devil's bit)
Succisella
Morina -- also placed in its own family, Morinaceae
Cephalaria
Pterocephalus
Pycnocomon
Triplostegia

References

External links
Dipsacaceae of Mongolia in FloraGREIF

Historically recognized angiosperm families
Dipsacales